The Talin Power Plant or Dalin Power Plant is a mix-generation power plant in Siaogang District, Kaohsiung, Taiwan.

As of November 2022 it has four operational units: two 800 MW ultra-supercritical coal-fired units, which went into commercial operation on February 13, 2018 and October 24, 2019, a 500 MW gas-fired unit, which went into commercial operation on October 15, 1975 and a 550 MW gas-fired unit, which went into commercial operation on September 12, 1994.

Fuel supply
The plant receives its coal supply for the fuel from Indonesia (49%), Australia (46%), Russia (4%) and Colombia (1%) to the adjacent Port of Kaohsiung and by conveyor to the plant from the port.

Events
The power plant was commissioned in 1969.

31 August 2012
The two coal-fired 300-MW-units were decommissioned on August 31, 2012. These two units will be replaced by two 800 MW ultra supercritical units from the current existing low-efficiency units. The construction permit was given on 25 October 2011 by the Ministry of Economic Affairs and scheduled for commercial operation on 1 July 2016 and 1 July 2017 respectively.

29 May 2016
Two workers killed and fiver others injured when the scaffolding used by them for work collapsed.

19 October 2016
One generator of the plant tripped at 7:32 a.m. and was rectified four hours later.

8 August 2017
The ignition of the first stage of ultra supercritical steam generator at the plant of 200 MW capacity in stages until it reaches its total capacity of 800 MW in the coming weeks.

3 November 2017
The two oil-fired 375-MW-units were decommissioned on November 3, 2017.

July 2018
The number one generator of the plant experienced mechanical failure on 28 July 2018. Inspection was carried out two days later on 30 July 2018.

Awards
On 8 November 2010, the power plant won the outstanding award at the 23rd National QCC Competition, organized by Industrial Development Bureau of the Ministry of Economic Affairs.

Transportation
The power plant is accessible South West from Siaogang Station of Kaohsiung MRT.

See also

 List of power stations in Taiwan
 Electricity sector in Taiwan

References

External links

 Talin power station at SourceWatch

1969 establishments in Taiwan
Buildings and structures in Kaohsiung
Coal-fired power stations in Taiwan
Energy infrastructure completed in 1969